Ryan James Viggars (born 17 April 2003) is a Welsh professional footballer currently playing as a striker for Charlton Athletic.

Club career

Charlton Athletic
Viggars joined Charlton Athletic from Sheffield United in 2021.

Needham Market (loan)
On 26 August 2022, Viggars joined Needham Market on loan until 1 October 2022.

Career statistics

Club
.

Notes

References

2003 births
Living people
Welsh footballers
Wales youth international footballers
Association football forwards
Sheffield United F.C. players
Charlton Athletic F.C. players
Needham Market F.C. players